Senator Otero may refer to:

Ángel M. Rodríguez Otero (born 1967), Senate of Puerto Rico
Mercedes Otero (1938–2012), Senate of Puerto Rico